Janette Miiko "Janie" Takeda-Reed (born April 15, 1993) is an American, former collegiate All-American, medal-winning Olympian, professional softball outfielder. She played college softball at Oregon, where she earned three First Team All-Pac-12 honors. She also was named a First Team and Second Team All-American three of her four years. She is a member of the elite 300 hits, 200 runs, 100 stolen base club. Takeda-Reed since graduating competes for the Team USA softball team and competed at the 2020 Summer Olympics and won a silver medal.

Early and personal life 
Takeda-Reed was born Janette Miiko Takeda in Placentia, California. She is the youngest and most decorated of three sisters in a softball family. The oldest, Allison, played in high school and Michelle, middle, played softball at the collegiate level for Maryland and Southern Mississippi University. Takeda attended El Dorado High School and played travel ball for the OC Batbusters. The 5'7" outfielder bats left handed, throws right handed, wore Oregon's jersey number 19, and currently wears Team USA's jersey number 9. Growing up in a softball family meant that Takeda would bat six days a week with her dad and was offensively different from her sisters. When asked why Takeda loves softball she states, "I enjoy when a team comes together and fights for a common goal. I also love when the girls on your team not only make you a better player, but a better person and add laughter and joy to your life." Takeda's dream job is to work on sports films and in sports journalism reporting for games and making a difference in women's sports.

Playing career

High school
Janie graduated from El Dorado High School, located in Placentia, California, in 2011. Takeda played on the varsity softball team for all four years and was voted Female Athlete of the Year during her senior year. Takeda participated in a total of 85 games and with 10 wins and 14 losses in her final high school season. Takeda held an overall batting average of .466 and 132 hits. Takeda had an on base percentage of .503, with 26 runs batted in (RBI) and scored a total of 63 runs. Takeda is a four time All-Century League winner, a Cal Hi Sports/ All-Orange County 1st team, and a league co-MVP. Off the field, Takeda received honor roll pick her senior year and distinguished scholar.

Travel softball
Takeda played for the OC Batbusters from 2008–2011. In 2010, Takeda helped her team to a 3rd place finish in the 2010 Premier Girls Softball Tourney. In 2011, Takeda had a .460 batting average during the PGF tournament and lead her team to a 4th place finish.

College 
Takeda graduated from the University of Oregon in 2015, majoring in journalism with a 3.17 grade point average. Takeda played for the Ducks, rostered as number 19 on the softball team. She was a three time NFCA All American and a three time first team All-Pac12. Takeda stated, " I chose Oregon because I wanted to play in the best conference in the country. I also love the city of Eugene and loved what the coaches were and are about. I loved being a part of a rapidly growing program. During Takeda's senior year, she was named to the USA softball player of the year preseason top 50 watch list and received the UO's Jackson Award. The Jackson athletic trophy is awarded annually each spring to an outstanding graduating senior female athlete. The recipient is selected based on outstanding athletic ability, scholastic achievement, leadership ability, and inspiration to other athletes. Nominations are made by UO student-athletes and winners are selected by student-athletes and athletic department staff. Aside from Takeda's accomplishments on the field, she started a community service project at Mt. Pisgah, which dealt with restoring the mountain by planting trees. She delivered food to local families as a part of the Thanksgiving basket drive and was a key contributor to raising money for the UNICEF campus group's drive for "Chemo Ducks". During Takeda's junior year at UO, she was named NFCA second team All America, NCAA Eugene regional MVP, 1st team All-Pacific region, and 1st team All-Pac-12. Her season statistics included, a .388 batting average, went 20 for 24 on stolen bases, .545 slugging percentage, and a .451 on base percentage. During her sophomore season, she was named NFCA 1st team All American, 1st team All-Pacific region, 1st team All-Pac-12, and NCAA regional All-Tournament team. Her stats include a .466 batting average, went 31 for 37 on stolen bases, slugged .582, and had a .466 on base percentage. During the 2014 spring season, Takeda was chosen by ESPN to blog the Duck's journey to the Women College World Series. Takeda titled her blog, Time to Finish What We Started and spoke about the teams emotions throughout the season and the balance it takes to handle work, school, and the pressure that comes with both tasks. Takeda holds 4 career records at Oregon, most career hits 309, most career runs 204, most career doubles 42 and most career stolen bases 102. She also holds the single season record for triples 8. She was also added to the 300 hits-200 runs - 100 stolen bases club.

Professional 
Takeda was drafted 26th overall by the Dallas Charge in the 2015 NPF Draft, but chose to take her career towards Team USA.

Team USA 
Takeda has been a member of the United States women's national softball team for four years and chose to roster for Team USA over the Dallas Charge. She represented Team USA in the World Cup of Softball during the summer of 2018. She represented the Team USA at the 2020 Summer Olympics and won a silver medal. Takeda had four hits and drove in a run for Team USA. She had two of her hits during the gold medal game that Team USA lost to Team Japan 2–0.

Personal life
Takeda is married to professional baseball pitcher Jake Reed.

Statistics

References

1993 births
Living people
American sportspeople of Japanese descent
Oregon Ducks softball players
Olympic softball players of the United States
Pan American Games silver medalists for the United States
Pan American Games medalists in softball
Softball players at the 2015 Pan American Games
People from Placentia, California
Sportspeople from Orange County, California
Softball players from California
Medalists at the 2015 Pan American Games
Softball players at the 2020 Summer Olympics
Medalists at the 2020 Summer Olympics
Olympic silver medalists for the United States in softball
Olympic medalists in softball